Quercus laevis, the turkey oak, is a member of the red oak group of oaks. It is native to the southeastern United States. The name turkey oak derives from the resemblance of the leaves to a turkey's foot. A Turkish and southern European species Quercus cerris is also commonly referred to as Turkey oak, so Quercus laevis is sometimes referred to as American turkey oak to distinguish it from the European species.

Description 
They have 3–7 slender lobes, deeply incised between the lobes, each lobe with 1–3 bristle teeth at the tip. The leaves turn red in Autumn.

Distribution and habitat 
Turkey oak occurs on the coastal plain from Virginia south to central Florida, and west to southeast Louisiana, where it mingles with many tropical trees such as mature coconut palms and large Cuban Laurel (Ficus) trees.

It typically grows on poor, thin, dry, rocky or sandy soils where few other oaks other than blackjack oak (Q. marilandica) can thrive. It does not have the beautiful crown form of many oaks, but is nonetheless a valuable tree for growing on infertile, dry, sandy sites. The deeply lobed leaves are also attractive. It associates as an understory tree with longleaf pine and other pine stands on sandy knolls in the southeastern United States.

References

laevis
Trees of the Southeastern United States
Plants described in 1788